State Highway 190 runs in Erode district of Tamil Nadu, India. It is a second major road for connecting the towns of Erode and Karur.

Route 
The highway runs parallel to Erode-Karur Highway as an alternate road between Karumandampalayam and Salaipudur, passing through Vellottamparappu,Thamaraipalayam and Othakadai to a length of 17.2 km. Using this road will eliminate the need to pass 2 level crossings which is present in the main highway.

Major junctions 

 Branches off from State Highway 84 at Karumandampalayam
 State Highway 189 at Othakadai
 Joins back with State Highway 84 at Salaipudur

References

State highways in Tamil Nadu